R41 may refer to:
 R41 (South Africa), a road
 Fluoromethane, a refrigerant
 , a destroyer of the Royal Navy
 Junkers R41, a German trainer aircraft
 R41: Risk of serious damage to eyes, a risk phrase
 Small nucleolar RNA R41